Tobacco ring can refer to:
 A type of onion ring, a type of food. 
 For a tobacco smoke ring, see smoke ring.